Adolph Strecker (October 21, 1822 – November 7, 1871) was a German chemist who is remembered primarily for his work with amino acids.

Life and work 
Strecker was born in Darmstadt, the son of Friedrich Ludwig Strecker, an archivist working for the hessian Grand Duke, and Henriette Amalie Johannette Koch. Adolph Strecker attended school in Darmstadt until 1838 when he changed to the higher Gewerbeschule. After receiving his abitur in 1840, Strecker began studying science at the University of Giessen, where Justus Liebig was a professor. In August 1842, Strecker received his PhD and began teaching at a realschule in Darmstadt. He refused one offer to work for Liebig, but in 1846 he accepted another and became Liebig's private assistant at the University of Giessen. Strecker finished his habilitation in 1848 and became a lecturer at the university.

Strecker investigated a wide variety of problems in both organic and inorganic chemistry during his time at Giessen. Examples include the molecular masses of silver and carbon, the reactions of lactic acid, the decomposition of hippuric acid by nitric acid, and the separation of cobalt and nickel.

Strecker wanted to leave Giessen for a position at the University of Berlin, but when he heard of an open position at Norway's University of Christiania, he applied for it and in 1851 became a professor there.  While in Norway, Strecker focused on organic chemistry, covering a broad range of topics from organometallic chemistry to natural products.

Strecker left Norway on Christian Gottlob Gmelin's death in 1860 to accept the latter's position at the University of Tübingen.  There he conducted research on guanine, xanthine, caffeine, and theobromine, and on the very toxic thallium oxides, which damaged his health severely. He moved to the University of Würzburg in 1870, but his first semester was interrupted by the Franco-Prussian War of 1870–1871. Strecker became an officer during the war and returned to the university after it, where he started his last semester.  In the summer of 1871 he undertook a recreational holiday in Berchtesgaden, Bavaria, but his health began to deteriorate. Strecker died in Würzburg, where he is buried in the Hauptfriedhof.

Strecker synthesis 
The Strecker synthesis of amino acids involves the reaction of potassium cyanide, ammonium chloride, and an aldehyde to make an alpha amino acid.  The reaction can also be run with ammonia, hydrogen cyanide, and an aldehyde.

Because of the relative simplicity of the reactants, the Strecker synthesis has been invoked by those studying both the origin of life and meteoritic amino acids.

Also named for Strecker are the Strecker degradation, which involves the conversion of amino acids into imines and then into ketones, and the Strecker sulfite alkylation.

Notable people who taught Strecker 
 Justus von Liebig (1803–1873)

Notable students of Strecker 
 Georg Zehfuss (de) (1832–1901)

Family 
Strecker, while serving as a professor in Norway, returned to Germany for several holidays. During one such visit to Darmstadt, Strecker, on July 3, 1852, married Karoline Auguste Natalie Weber (1852–1853), who died  months later – on October 13, 1853. She had given birth on October 2, 1853, to Friederike Caroline Sophie Christiane Natalie Strecker. Adolph Stecker married a second time on September 29, 1855.

References

External links 
 Adolph Strecker obituary by Rudolf Wagner from Berichte der Deutschen Chemischen Gesellschaft, 1872, part V, pp. 125–131
 Obituary in the Journal of the Chemical Society, 1872, volume 25, p. 353
 Adolph Strecker by B. Lepsius (1892), Allgemeine Deutsche Biographie, volume 36, Leipzig: Duncker & Humblot – entry for Strecker
 Adolph Strecker – brief biography and two pictures at Tübingen University
 Regnault-Strecker's kurzes Lehrbuch der Chemie. Vieweg, Braunschweig 1851 Digital edition by the University and State Library Düsseldorf
 2. Organische Chemie. 1853
 1. Anorganische Chemie. 3., verb. Aufl. 1855
 2. Organische Chemie. 2. Aufl.1857
 1. Anorganische Chemie. 4. Aufl.1858
 1. Anorganische Chemie. 9., neu bearb. Aufl. / von Johannes Wislicenus. 1877

Academic staff of the University of Würzburg
Academic staff of the University of Tübingen
19th-century German chemists
University of Giessen alumni
Academic staff of the University of Oslo
1822 births
1871 deaths
Scientists from Darmstadt